Sven Richard Friberg (7 February 1895 – 26 May 1964) was a Swedish association football defender who won a bronze medal at the 1924 Summer Olympics. Between 1915 and 1928 he played 41 international matches and scored no goals.

Playing career

Club
Friberg won the Svenska Serien in 1914–15 with IFK Göteborg.

With Örgryte IS he won the Svenska Serien in 1920–21 and 1923–24 as well as Allsvenskan in 1925–26 and 1926–28.

International
Friberg captained the Sweden national team which won a bronze medal at the 1924 Summer Olympics. In total he made 41 appearances between 1915 and 1928, captaining 30.

Managerial career
Friberg returned to Örgryte IS as a coach, managing the club from 1930 to 1931.

Honours
IFK Göteborg
 Svenska Serien: 1914–15

Örgryte IS
 Svenska Serien: 1920–21, 1923–24
 Allsvenskan: 1925–26, 1926–28

References

1895 births
1964 deaths
Association football midfielders
Swedish footballers
Sweden international footballers
Svenska Serien players
Allsvenskan players
IFK Göteborg players
Örgryte IS players
Swedish football managers
Örgryte IS managers
Footballers at the 1924 Summer Olympics
Olympic footballers of Sweden
Olympic bronze medalists for Sweden
Olympic medalists in football
Medalists at the 1924 Summer Olympics